The NOVA School of Science and Technology (FCT NOVA or NOVA SST) is a Portuguese faculty of the NOVA University Lisbon located at the Caparica Campus, near Lisbon.

The School operates with great autonomy and awards degrees in several engineering and natural sciences specializations.

FCT pioneered in offering the first strictly computer science degree in Portugal.

Organization

This faculty is divided in several departments, each one responsible for teaching the classes relative to its specific area.
The majority of classes are meant for the degrees supplied by the department, but there are a few classes that are common to all degrees (for instance math classes) which are taught to all students.

Notable Professors and Students
People who have been awarded a degree by the NOVA School of Science and Technology or otherwise have attended or lectured in this institution, include:
 Elvira Fortunato, professor, physicist, engineer, and minister.
 António Câmara, professor, and entrepreneur.
 Carmona Rodrigues, professor, engineer, and politician.
 Miguel Telles Antunes, palaeontologist.
 Octávio Mateus, paleontologist, and biologist.

Notes

External links
Official website

NOVA University Lisbon
1977 establishments in Portugal
Educational institutions established in 1977